The men's shot put event at the 2004 World Junior Championships in Athletics was held in Grosseto, Italy, at Stadio Olimpico Carlo Zecchini on 13 July.  A 6 kg (junior implement) shot was used.

Medalists

Results

Final
13 July

Qualifications
13 July

Group A

Group B

Participation
According to an unofficial count, 33 athletes from 25 countries participated in the event.

References

Shot put
Shot put at the World Athletics U20 Championships